Party Sing Along with Mitch is an album by Mitch Miller & The Gang. It was released in 1959 on the Columbia label (catalog nos. CL-1331 and CS-8118).

The album debuted on Billboard magazine's popular albums chart on August 31, 1959, peaked at No. 7, and remained on that chart for 66 weeks. It was certified as a gold record by the RIAA.

Track listing
Side 1
 "I Love You Truly"
 Medley: "In the Shade of the Old Apple Tree" and "In the Good Old Summertime"
 "The Sweetest Story Ever Told"
 "Meet Me Tonight in Dreamland"
 "I Wonder Who's Kissing Her Now"
 Medley: "Goodnight Ladies" and "Home Sweet Home"

Side 2
 Medley: "My Gal Sal" and "Cuddle Up a Little Closer"
 "Ramblin' Wreck from Georgia Tech"
 Medley: "Bird in a Gilded Cage" and "Nellie"
 Medley: "Oh! What a Pal Was Mary" and "Harrigan"
 Medley: "School Days", "Sweet Rosie O'Grady", and "The Sidewalks of New York"
 "I'll Take You Home Again, Kathleen"

References

1959 albums
Columbia Records albums
Mitch Miller albums